Trojan Eddie is a 1996 British-Irish crime drama film directed by Gillies MacKinnon.

References

External links
 
 

1996 films
1990s crime drama films
1996 romantic drama films
British drama films
Films directed by Gillies MacKinnon
1990s English-language films
1990s British films